Pakistan has competed in 14 of the 22 Commonwealth Games, from 1954. Its most successful games have been the 1962 Commonwealth Games in Perth, where it was 4th in the overall rankings and won 8 Gold Medals. Its most successful event has been Wrestling, where it has won 42 medals, 21 of which have been Gold. It ranks 3rd overall in Wrestling at the Commonwealth Games. Between 1972 and 1989 it did not participate in any of these Games as it had temporarily withdrawn from the Commonwealth.

Medals by Games

Source:

Medals by sport

Gold Medals by sport (excluding Wrestling)

Athletics

Boxing

Weightlifting

See also
Pakistan at the Olympics
Pakistan at the Asian Games
Pakistan at the Paralympics

References

External links
 Official website

 
Pakistan and the Commonwealth of Nations
Nations at the Commonwealth Games